Las Villas is a comarca in the province of Salamanca, Castile and León, Spain. It contains elevenmunicipalities:
 Aldealengua
 Aldearrubia
 Arabayona de Mógica
 Babilafuente
 Cordovilla
 Encinas de Abajo
 Huerta
 Moríñigo
 San Morales
 Villoria
 Villoruela

Footnotes

References 

Comarcas of the Province of Salamanca